Dean Bosacki is a Canadian businessman.

Biography

Early life
He graduated from the University of British Columbia in Vancouver, British Columbia, Canada and received an M.B.A. from the Stanford Graduate School of Business in Palo Alto, California. He was a member of the Canadian Institute of Chartered Accountants.

Career
He worked at PricewaterhouseCoopers and BNP Paribas. From 2002 to 2007, he was Managing Director of Friend Skoler & Co., a $231 million buyout fund specializing in consumer products and business services companies. He is Co-Founder and Managing Partner of Manhattan Partners.

He sits on the Board of Directors of Academi.

References

Living people
Year of birth missing (living people)
University of British Columbia alumni
Stanford Graduate School of Business alumni
Canadian businesspeople
Blackwater (company) people